The 2017 FIBA U18 Women's European Championship Division C was the 12th edition of the Division C of the FIBA U18 Women's European Championship, the third tier of the European women's under-18 basketball championship. It was played in Pembroke, Malta, from 4 to 9 July 2017. Cyprus women's national under-18 basketball team won the tournament.

Participating teams

Final standings

Results

References

External links
FIBA official website

2017
2017–18 in European women's basketball
FIBA U18
FIBA
International basketball competitions hosted by Malta
Pembroke, Malta